Cecil Walter Wood (6 June 1878 – 28 November 1947) was a New Zealand architect. He was the dominant architect in Canterbury during the interwar period.

Early life
Wood was born in Christchurch, New Zealand in 1878. At his birth, the family lived in Cashel Street West near Antigua Street. His father, Robert Wood, was a timber merchant and later a Christchurch City councillor (1889–1895). His mother was Margaret Amelia (Amy) . His parents had married in 1865 and Cecil was their sixth child. Shortly after childbirth, his mother died on 27 September 1885 (the infant daughter had died two days prior); Cecil was seven at that time and affected by his mother's death. His eldest sister Amy was subsequently in charge of the younger siblings until his father remarried—to Elizabeth Anne —when Cecil was 13. The Wood children did not welcome their new mother and Cecil felt loneliness and resentment, to both his father and his stepmother, which lasted into adulthood.

Wood started his education at Miss Leete's School, a small private school for 20 primary pupils, in Gloucester Street. From age 10, he attended Christchurch West School. When he was 12, he received a scholarship that allowed him to attend courses at the School of Art at Canterbury College in the evenings and on Saturdays. Wood finished at Christchurch West aged 15. At Canterbury College, he gained "excellent passes" for his freehand drawings in his first year. As an architect, Wood is remembered for his artistic plans, where perspectives were drawn freehand and many regard his plans as art in itself. It is unclear why Wood chose architecture but it is assumed that the career of his uncle, the noted British architect Norman Shaw, was a consideration. His father's sister Agnes had married Shaw in Hampstead in 1867.

Training

Articles with Strouts

In June 1893, Wood's father paid NZ£100 to the architect Frederick Strouts for Cecil Wood to be articled to him. Strouts had qualified as an architect in England in 1869 after having emigrated to Christchurch in 1859. Strouts was one of the founders of the Canterbury Association of Architects in 1871. When Wood joined the firm, Strouts had just made Robert Ballantyne (1866–1936) a junior partner. Two major commissions that the office worked on during Wood's time were the Hyman Marks block of Christchurch Hospital and the homestead for Sir Heaton Rhodes, Otahuna. Strouts had a longstanding association with the Rhodes family and after Strouts retired, Wood received many of that family's commissions. At Otahuna, Wood designed a cottage in 1914 and a woolshed in 1927. After Rhodes' wife had died, Wood designed St Paul's Church—a small stone church in Tai Tapu—as a memorial to Lady Rhodes in 1929 (registered as Category I). In 1931, Wood designed the Tai Tapu library for Rhodes (registered as Category I). Strouts does not appear to have shaped Wood's architectural approach but Wood showed the same professionalism and integrity that he had observed in his teacher.

As was usual at the time, tertiary education was undertaken in the evenings and on Saturdays. Wood took a four-year diploma course at Canterbury College from 1894, where Samuel Hurst Seager was his teacher. Seager introduced Wood to Arts and Crafts architecture. In his first year at the college, Seager encouraged Wood to enter one of his designs to a competition run by the magazine The Australasian Builder and Contractors' News. Wood won third prize.

Wood finished his apprenticeship with Strouts and once Strouts retired in 1899, meaning that he only worked for existing clients or on follow-up projects, he finished his employment there.

Draftsman for Ballantyne and Clarkson

Ballantyne also left Strouts and set up a partnership with William Clarkson (1863–1917). Wood joined them in 1899 as their draughtsman. The office had a wide range of building types to design. Their commercial designs did not shape Wood's architectural practice but their domestic work was later reflected in Wood's own designs. It is not known for certain what designs Wood worked on but it is assumed that he had input to the Canterbury Hall (1899–1900), which created much publicity for Ballantyne and Clarkson. Another project where Wood was likely involved was a large domestic house on the corner of Salisbury Street, then known as Scott House but today mostly referred to as Ironside House. By 1901, Ballantyne and Clarkson had little work and that may have contributed to Wood's decision to go to England to further his career.

London County Council

Wood had received architectural training from both Strouts and Seager under the English tradition and it was thus a logical step for him to at some stage go to England himself to become more familiar with this genre. Once again, he received financial assistance from his father for this next stage of education. He left from the Port of Lyttelton on board SS Rotomahana for Wellington on 21 February 1901. From Wellington, he left for Sydney on 2 March on the SS Monowai. In Sydney, he took the SS Runic on its maiden-return journey to England, leaving on 8 March. Wood produced a pencil sketch of the Runic in Port Melbourne on 13 March.

Wood's uncle, Norman Shaw, had closed his office in 1896 but was still working and highly regarded. It would have been easy for Wood to get his uncle to give recommendations to other architects but Wood was too proud to ask for help. During his time in London, he visited his aunt and uncle just once and it was a social call. Wood found employment with the Housing Branch of the Architects' Department of London County Council. The branch was headed by the architect William Riley and their task was to create social housing so that the slums could be removed from central London. When he arrived, the group had just delivered the design for the Millbank Estate and this project was under construction. When he joined, the group started designing cottage estates. It is likely that Wood would have worked on Totterdown Fields, the first of the London County Council cottage estates. It was the Housing of the Working Classes Act 1900 that allowed local councils to create cottage estates. It was not just a stimulating working environment where Wood was surrounded by young and progressive architects, but also a highly political field where many of the underlying ideas of how to deal with the underclasses of society were based in socialism. From 1902 to 1904, a fellow New Zealand architect in the office was Basil Hooper from Dunedin.

Assistant to Robert Weir Schultz

In 1903, Wood joined the practice of Robert Weir Schultz, with the office located at Gray's Inn Square. Schultz, who had worked for Shaw from 1884 to 1886 and was heavily influenced by Shaw's chief clerk William Lethaby, was a leading proponent of the Arts and Craft movement and a member of the Art Workers' Guild. Schultz believed in sound craftsmanship and wanted every architect to start their apprenticeship with a builder. He rejected academicism and for that reason, he never joined the Royal Institute of British Architects (RIBA). Wood passed the RIBA Intermediate Examination in November 1904 while employed with Schultz and that would have allowed him to become an Associate, but he did not apply until 1919. It might have been Schultz's influence that Wood did not apply at the time he became eligible.

In his designs, Schultz paid close attention to the relationship between houses and their gardens. While Wood worked for him, Schultz had five or six assistants, but he never delegated any design work to them. One of the tasks that Wood performed for Schultz was to draw perspectives. Two designs that show Wood's initials are for Beaumonts in Four Elms, Kent, and for How Green House near Hever, Kent. Beaumonts was exhibited at the Royal Academy and then loaned to be displayed at the 1906–1907 International Exhibition in Christchurch, New Zealand. Wood's perspective of the How Green House was featured in the magazine British Architect in May 1906 and received a favourable review.The view of the garden front, cleverly drawn in coloured chalk, shows how a house may be broadly treated and well bound together in line and mass, whilst being very picturesque. There is a good balance of features, gables and chimneys...

Wood spent two years with Schultz and learned the importance of good planning, the choice of materials appropriate for the location and task, and how to work in with craftsmen so that a high quality of construction can be achieved.

Assistant to Leonard Stokes

In 1905, Wood moved to the office of Leonard Stokes. Like Schultz, he was a leading architect in the Arts and Craft movement and he also had a large office. Stokes designed churches, convents, education buildings, houses, and telephone exchanges. A devout Roman Catholic, the church was a major client for him. While Wood was in the office, Minterne House in Minterne Magna, Dorset, for Edward Digby, 10th Baron Digby was being worked on. Another project was the Gerrard Street Telephone Exchange in Gerrard Street, London. Stokes was difficult to work for as he was quick-tempered, and both his staff and clients "often felt the whip of his tongue". He was acknowledged and admired for his rational design approach and for his original designs. His work showed a good sense of scale and he paid attention to detail. Wood spent some months only at Stokes' office but was much influenced by him, and later designs for education buildings and houses drew inspiration from Stokes' designs.

Independent practice

Hurst Seager, Wood and Munnings

On his return to New Zealand, Wood stopped over in Wellington in February 1906 to visit two of his brothers. Effective 12 February 1906, he became partner to Seager in his office in Cathedral Square, with their firm known as "Hurst Seager and Wood". Wood and Seager turned their attention to the upcoming International Exhibition, which was to be held in North Hagley Park from November 1906. The Liberal Government had passed the Workers' Dwelling Act 1905, with the same philosophy as the projects that Wood had worked on in London. They won the South Island section of the competition for a model workers' house and their design was built on the exhibition grounds. After the International Exhibition closed in April 1907, their building was moved to 52 Longfellow Street in Sydenham where it still stands today. The house is registered with Heritage New Zealand as a Category II item. They also entered the North Island competition for model workers' houses and their design was one of the chosen ones; 5 houses were built in Petone where an initial 25 houses were built by the Liberal Government. Compared to the other social houses, they were simpler and more intimate in scale. The local media reacted badly to the designs, which lacked typical elements that were common at the time and present in the other 20 houses. The New Zealand Mail labelled their design "The Blot" and described it as "unsatisfactory throughout" and "a grave mistake": erecting "one of them would have been too many." Seager would have had a greater involvement in the design than Wood as he had designed timber cottages since 1900 when one was designed for John Macmillan Brown in Cashmere. The Petone houses are nearly identical to cottage No. 2 at The Spur in Clifton, Christchurch. Two of the houses in Petone are registered by Heritage New Zealand: 16 Patrick Street is a Category II entry and 19 Patrick Street a Category I entry. In addition, there is a Historic Area registration covering much of the social housing project.

In February 1907, Joseph Munnings (1879–1937) became a further partner, with the name of the firm changing to Hurst Seager, Wood and Munnings. Munnings was just a few months younger than Wood and they knew each other from Canterbury College where Seager had been their teacher, and Munnings then did his articles with his teacher. Afterwards, Munnings went to England and he worked for Leonard Stokes with Wood later also joined that firm. Munnings did some work on his own account in 1906 upon his return from England before joining Seager and Wood. The partnership between the three architects was dissolved in January 1909, with Munnings returning to England and Wood starting his own practice in the same building – the AMP Building in Cathedral Square.

It is uncertain whether Seager gave his junior partners much of an opportunity to develop their own architectural concepts. Two of the designs produced between 1907 and 1909 are credited to Munnings without doubt: the Convent Chapel in Barbadoes Street and a church in Merivale. Work was plentiful and Seager asked in April 1907 that the commission for the church be revoked. The vestry asked him to reconsider and Seager instead suggested that Munnings carry out the design. The church project was later abandoned. The chapel, however, was built and was considered the only Byzantine Revival architecture in the Southern Hemisphere. In 1906, Wood had produced an early perspective for the project but this is considered a reflection of his skill in preparing drawings, with Munnings credited as being the architect in contemporary reporting by The Press. Other projects where Wood had at least some input are the building for James Hay on the southwest corner of Bealey Avenue and Durham Street and the building for Norman Lindsay Macbeth in Wairarapa Terrace in Merivale; for both the buildings, the drawings are in Wood's style and/or have his handwriting.

Opportunities for Wood and Munnings to gain experience arose when Seager travelled to Europe in March 1907, putting the partners in charge of the firm's projects. For Wood, this was likely what encouraged him to become independent. The Press reported in November 1908 that Seager and his wife expected to be back in Christchurch on 22 January 1909. And on 30 January 1909, the three architects announced that they dissolved their partnership effective that day, with existing commissions remaining with Wood and Munnings at office No. 13 in the building, with Seager retaining his office No. 14. Leopold Atkinson, who had been with the firm for eight years, left at the same time and became an independent architect in Wanganui.

Later career
Despite the newspaper advertisement that existing work would remain with Munnings and Wood, Munnings soon returned to England, leaving New Zealand at the end of April. Wood initially worked by himself but had employed Andrew Reese (1887–1917) as a draughtsman by February 1910. Reese worked for Wood until 1914 and on 1 March 1915, he entered into a partnership with George Hart. Wood took on trainee architects and the three early ones that are known of are Heathcote Helmore (who started after he finished his education at Christ's College in 1912), Guy Cotterill (started 1 February 1915), and Shirley Blackburne from 1915.

Later trainee architects were Paul Pascoe and Miles Warren.

Wood never entered any architectural competitions once in private practice but was held in high regard by the profession as evidenced by the fact that he was appointed judge at the three largest competitions during his time: for the Auckland War Memorial Museum (1922), the Auckland Civic Centre (1924), and the National Art Gallery and Museum in Wellington. The two other competitions that he judged were for the Wellington Public Library (now used as the City Gallery Wellington) and the Ashburton War Memorial.

Wood received a commission from Harry Knight to design a homestead for his property at Racecourse Hill near Darfield. The English Domestic Revival house was finished in 1912.

In 1922, Wood was one of two architects nominated by the Institute of Architects for judging designs for the Auckland War Memorial Museum; the other architect was Reginald Ford of Wanganui. In 1924, Wood was on the competition panel for the Auckland Civic Centre alongside Walter Bush (Auckland's city engineer), W. Gray Young (architect from Wellington), George Baildon and John Dempsey (the latter two both councillors for Auckland City Council).

He designed many heritage buildings in New Zealand including Wellington Cathedral of St Paul and the Memorial Dining Hall at Christ's College. He became an associate of the New Zealand Institute of Architects in 1914, a fellow in 1926 and was elected the President in 1937. He was one of three prominent New Zealand architects in the inter-war period; the others were W. Gray Young (Wellington) and William Gummer (Auckland).

Family and death
From 1907 to 1909, Wood lived at The Spur in Sumner in one of the houses designed by Hurst Seager. On 22 December 1909 at St Luke's Church, Wood married Iris Bruce, the daughter of W. Bruce, with the ceremony performed by vicar William Sedgwick. The Woods had no children. In 1911, Wood designed a house for his wife and himself at 74 Richmond Hill Road in Sumner. This was one of the first houses in the 1910 Richmond Hill subdivision; it was located above the cliff behind Nayland Street. They lived there from 1911 until 1922, when they moved into the central city. The area, including this property, was red-zoned after the earthquakes.

In October 1944, Wood designed a retirement house for his wife and himself. The building, at 16 Helmore Road (since renamed to Helmores Lane), is located in Merivale and was finished in 1946. The façade facing Rhodes Street has a steep pitch and this design element was adopted by other local architects for domestic buildings. Wood died at his home on 28 November 1947. His wife died more than three decades later in 1979. Their ashes were interned in the ambulatory of St Paul's Cathedral.

Cecil Wood Way on Richmond Hill in Sumner, where he had designed many houses, was named after him in the early 1980s.

Gallery of his work

Footnotes

Notes

References 

1878 births
1947 deaths
People educated at Christchurch West High School
University of Canterbury alumni
People from Christchurch
Architects of cathedrals
20th-century New Zealand architects
New Zealand expatriates in England